Churchstow is a small village situated on the A379 road in the South Hams district in south Devon, England. The parish had a population of 465 in 2011, according to the 2011 UK Census.

Etymology and history
The local church, St Mary's is 14th century and is a fine example of churches built during this time in the South Hams district. The building is made using local dark slate. It is a Grade II* listed building. As the church is situated atop a high ridge, the village was thereafter named "Church-stow". In 1220, Churchstow was the parent town of Kingsbridge.

The village has one public house, the Church House Inn. Built in the 17th century, the building is made from green slate. It is a distributor of beverages from the St Austell Brewery and is a recognised Cask Marque public house.

Nearby villages include Thurlestone, Aveton Gifford and Loddiswell.

References

External links
Devon County Council website with historical information regarding the village 
The village's website

Villages in South Hams
Civil parishes in South Hams